The 1956 United States Senate election in Arizona took place on November 6, 1956. Incumbent Democratic U.S. Senator Carl Hayden ran for reelection to a sixth term, defeating Republican nominee Attorney General of Arizona Ross F. Jones in the general election.

Democratic primary

Candidates
 Carl T. Hayden, incumbent U.S. Senator
 Robert E. Miller, candidate for U.S. Senate in 1938, 1940, 1950

Results

Republican primary

Candidates
 Ross F. Jones, Attorney General of Arizona
 Albert H. Mackenzie, attorney

Results

General election

See also 
 1956 United States Senate elections

References

1956
Arizona
United States Senate